The Saturn Award for Best Science Fiction Film is one of the Saturn Awards that has been presented annually since 1972 by Academy of Science Fiction, Fantasy and Horror Films to the best film in the science fiction genre of the previous year.

Winners and nominees
In the list below, winners are listed first in bold, followed by the other nominees. The number of the ceremony (1st, 2nd, etc.) appears in parentheses after the awards year, linked to the article (if any) on that ceremony.

1970s

1980s

1990s

2000s

2010s

2020s

See also
Science fiction film

External links

Internet Movie Database: 1st, 2nd, 3rd, 4th, 5th, 6th, 7th, 8th, 9th, 10th, 11th, 12th, 13th, 14th, 15th, 16th, 17th, 18th, 19th, 20th, 21st, 22nd, 23rd, 24th, 25th, 26th, 27th, 28th, 29th, 30th, 31st, 32nd, 33rd, 34th, 35th, 36th, 37th, 38th, 39th, 40th, 41st, 42nd, 43rd

Saturn award
Science Fiction Film